Peñón Blanco  is one of the 39 municipalities of Durango, in north-western Mexico. The municipal seat lies at Peñón Blanco. The municipality covers an area of 1827 km².

In 2010, the municipality had a total population of 10,473, up from 9,891 in 2005. 

In 2010, the town of Peñón Blanco had a population of 5,271. Other than the town of Peñón Blanco, the municipality had 103 localities, the largest of which (with 2010 population in parentheses) was: General Jesús Agustín Castro (Independencia) (1,907), classified as rural.

References

Municipalities of Durango